George Legge (12 July 1886 – 25 September 1915) was a Scottish amateur footballer who played in the Scottish League for Queen's Park as a forward.

Personal life
As of 1911, Legge was working as a teacher at Skerry's College. Soon after the outbreak of the First World War in August 1914, Legge enlisted as a private in the Queen's Own Cameron Highlanders. He was killed in action on 29 September 1915, in an advance on Auchy-lez-La-Bassée during the early stages of the Battle of Loos. He is commemorated on the Loos Memorial.

Career statistics

References

Scottish footballers
1915 deaths
British Army personnel of World War I
British military personnel killed in World War I
1886 births
Footballers from Glasgow
Queen's Own Cameron Highlanders soldiers
Scottish Football League players
Association football forwards
Queen's Park F.C. players
Scottish electrical engineers
20th-century Scottish educators
Schoolteachers from Glasgow
20th-century Scottish engineers